Piero Antona (born 5 April 1912 in Vigevano; died 5 January 1969) was an Italian football player.

Honours
 Serie A champion: 1937/38.
 Coppa Italia winner: 1938/39.

External links

1912 births
1969 deaths
Italian footballers
Serie A players
Piacenza Calcio 1919 players
Inter Milan players
ACF Fiorentina players
A.C. Cuneo 1905 players
Association football midfielders
S.G. Gallaratese A.S.D. players
Vigevano Calcio players